Thomas III d'Autremencourt or de Stromoncourt (died 15 March 1311) was the fourth Lord of Salona (modern Amfissa) in Central Greece, and the last of his family. He ruled his domain from 1294 until his death in the Battle of the Cephissus against the Catalan Company in 1311. At the same time, he also held the position of marshal of the Principality of Achaea. After his death, his widow and domain passed to Roger Deslaur, who in the aftermath of Cephissus was for a brief time (1311–1312) selected as the leader of the Catalan Company.

Sources 

 
 

12th-century births
1311 deaths
Lords of Salona
People killed in action
Marshals of the Principality of Achaea